The Indian Railway Service of Mechanical Engineering, abbreviated as IRSME, is one of the group 'A' central engineering services of the Indian railways. The officers of this service are responsible for managing the Mechanical Engineering Division of the Indian Railways. Till 2019, IRSME officers were drawn from the Combined Engineering Service Examination (ESE) conducted by Union Public Service Commission. All appointments to the Group 'A' services are made by the president of India.

Recruitment
There are two modes of recruitment to IRSME Group 'A': 
 50% through direct recruitment through the annual Civil Services Examination conducted by UPSC. 
 50% through promotion from Group 'B' officers of Mechanical departments of the Zonal Railways.

Current cadre strength of IRSME officers is around 1700, serving in 68 divisions and 3 Production units across 17 Zonal Railways in India and the Railway Board.

Previous modes of recruitment 

 Engineering Services ExaminationThe incumbents who were Graduates in Engineering used to get selected by the Union Public Services Commission, the apex gazetted recruitment body of the Government of India. In 2020 Railways separated itself from Engineering Services Exam (ESE) and made Indian Railway Management Services (IRMS). Earlier the recruitment used to be through UPSC Engineering Services Exam for Engineers but now after 2 years halt it's through UPSC Civil Services Exam from 2022; an all India written test followed by interview for selected candidates. Earlier top rankers of Mechanical Engineering only used to get the chance to join IRSME cadre, but now it has become General Cadre or Cadre for all Civil Services aspirants.
 Special Class Railway Apprentice examination Special Class Railway Apprentice (SCRA) was a programme by which candidates are selected by the Union Public Service Commission (UPSC) India, to train in the undergraduate program in mechanical engineering at the Indian Railways Institute of Mechanical and Electrical Engineering, Jamalpur. This programme started in 1927 and was one of the oldest in India.  After the 2015 examination, Railways decided to close down this examination after UPSC communicated that it was not inclined to continue conducting the examination. However, the Ministry of Finance in 2021, in its report on the rationalisation of Indian Railways has recommended to start conducting the exam again stating that Indian Railways requires specialised training and skills beyond what is part of a regular graduation program.

The Indian Railway Management Services is merged into Civil Services in 2022 which now on will be conducted by the Union Public Service Commission (UPSC) of India. The UPSC is responsible for recruiting middle and top-level bureaucrats for the Government of India.

Training 
After selection, the IRSME probationers report to their Centralized Training Institute (CTI): Indian Railways Institute of Mechanical and Electrical Engineering, Jamalpur, (IRIMEE) for joining formalities and induction into the cadre as Officer Trainees or Probationary Officers. This is followed by visit to a host of academies and institutions, over a period of next 78 weeks, to give wide-ranging exposure to officer trainees which would be useful in their career as railway officers. Some of these institutions include:

 Alma mater at Indian Railways Institute of Mechanical and Electrical Engineering, Jamalpur (IRIMEE) 
 Railway Foundation and Induction Course at National Academy of Indian Railway (NAIR), Vadodara 
 Marketing Management and Transport Economics at Indian Institute of Management (IIM)
 Ethical Governance Training at  Initiatives of Change (IofC), Panchgani
 Metro Rail Training at Delhi Metro Rail Corporation (DMRC), New Delhi
 Signals and Tele-communications Training at Indian Railways Institute of Signal Engineering and Telecommunications (IRISET), Secundarabad
P-Way, Works and Contract Management Training at Indian Railways Institute of Civil Engineering (IRICEN), Pune
 Locomotive, Rolling Stock and Workshop Management Training at Indian Railways Institute of Mechanical and Electrical Engineering (IRIMEE), Jamalpur
 Electric Traction and Railway Electrification Management Training at Indian Railways Institute of Electrical Engineering (IRIEEN), Nashik
 Railway Information Infrastructure Management Training at Centre for Railway information systems (CRIS), New Delhi
 Parliamentary Procedures Training at Bureau of Parliamentary Studies and Training (BPST), New Delhi
 Divisional attachments at 68 divisions spread across the length and breadth of the country
Industrial Field visits – ICF, MCF, RCF and BLW
 Appreciation Visits to various Railway establishments situated in difficult terrains – Konkan Railways, K-K Line, Shimla-Kalka Toy Train, Nilgiri Railway, Udhampur-Srinagar
 Foreign attachment with Deutsche Bahn and Siemens Mobility in Germany

Role and function
The main areas of responsibility

 Motive Power availability (Locomotive sheds)
 Crew Management (Locomotive operations)
 Rolling Stock Management (Coaching depots, freight yards)
 Traffic restoration in case of accidents
 Production Units - Locomotives, Coaches, Wheel sets, etc.
 Repair and Manufacturing workshops

This organisation was central to all rolling stock operations when the only modes of traction were Steam Locomotives and Diesel Electric Locomotives. With the use of electric traction on the trunk routes, the responsibility of traction operations has been shared with the Electrical Department.

All the coaches and wagons are maintained by the Mechanical Department. The air-conditioning part of the coaches on the system was maintained by the Electrical Department. A Railway Board order to bring the entire rolling stock under unified maintenance of the Mechanical Department in 2003 was held in abeyance under pressure from Electrical Department Unions.

This has been adopted in 2016 wherein all locomotives (electric and diesel) including crew is now under electric department. The entire rolling stock maintenance including MEMU and train lighting of coaches is now under mechanical department. Accordingly, at Railway Board level post of Member Mechanical (MM) is redesignated as Member Rolling Stock (MRS).

Train operations
The responsibilities and assignments of train operations are loosely referred to as Open Line. A great deal of emphasis is placed on open line experience. Indeed, there are few cases of people who have succeeded in the organisation without a significant tenures on the Open Line.

From a general public's point of view the most exciting tasks are related to accident relief and traffic restoration. IRSME is responsible for designing, acquiring / building and maintenance of the accident relief infrastructure and organisation. Accidents are times of great stress and anxiety. In times of emergency, the appropriate officer is responsible for mobilizing the Accident Relief Medical Equipment (ARME) and Accident Relief Trains (ART).

Production units
The Indian Railways does a great deal of manufacturing and would rival any other engineering house in India. The overall manufacturing is split between the Production Units (managed independently) and the zonal workshops (managed by the zonal Railways)

Repair and manufacturing
The zonal railways have workshops that manufacture and repair equipment. These workshops can be very large (e.g. It is only the organisational structure that prevents them from being called production units.

Organisation

The IRSME is headed by a member rolling stock in the Railway Board (Ministry of Railways). Member rolling stock is better known by the acronym MRS.

In each of the zones the organisation is headed by a Principal Chief Mechanical Engineer. The PCME reports to the General Manager of the railway. The office of the Member Rolling Stock of the Railway Board guides the PCME on technical matters and policy.

At the divisional level the Senior Divisional Mechanical Engineer head the organisation. The Senior Divisional Mechanical Engineer reports to the Divisional Railway Manager of the division. Technical supervision is provided by the zonal Principal Chief Mechanical Engineer.

At entry level an IRSME officer works as ADME (Assistant Divisional Mechanical Engineer) and commands 50–250 staff.

Workshops are headed by Chief Works Manager. Since workshops are managed by the zonal Railways, the CWMs report to the PCME.

Production units, the manufacturing plants of the Indian Railways, are managed directly by the ministry. The general managers of the PUs report to the Railway Board. The production units are:
  Marathwada Rail coach factory, Latur
 Banaras Locomotive Works, Varanasi
 Chittaranjan Locomotive Works, Chittaranjan
 Patiala Locomotive Works, Patiala
 Integral Coach Factory, Chennai
 Rail Coach Factory, Kapurthala
 Modern Coach Factory, Raebareli
 Wheel & Axle Plant, Bangalore
 Rail Spring Karkhana, Gwalior
 Rail Wheel Plant, Bela, Chhapra.

Organizational structure

Distinguished officers

See also
 Jamalpur Gymkhana
 Centralised Training Institutes of the Indian Railways
 Indian Railways organisational structure
 Indian Engineering Service

External links
 Indian Railway Service of Mechanical Engineering 

Mechanical Engineering
Mechanical Engineering
